was a politician and cabinet minister in the pre-war Empire of Japan.

Maeda was a native of Wakayama Prefecture, and a graduate of the Tokyo Hōgakuin (the predecessor to the law school of Chuo University). He received his law degree in 1903. He was elected to the Lower House of the Diet of Japan in the 1917 General Election, under the Rikken Seiyūkai banner, and was subsequently reelected to the same seat during the next nine elections. Maeda served as Secretary-General of the party in 1925. In 1927, Prime Minister Tanaka Giichi picked Maeda as his Director-General of the Cabinet Legislation Bureau. Maeda subsequent was appointed Minister of Commerce and Industry under the Inukai administration in 1931. He returned to the Cabinet under the Hirota administration as Railway Minister in 1936. In 1939, Maeda was asked to resume his post as Railway Minister under the Hiranuma administration.

As with all other Japanese politicians, Maeda was forced to join the Taisei Yokusankai created by Prime Minister Fumimaro Konoe in 1940, and served as the party's Chairman for Administrative Affairs.  During World War II, Maeda served as Minister of Transport and Communications, under the Koiso administration.
After the surrender of Japan, Maeda joined the Japan Progressive Party, which had emerged under the occupation of Japan. However, he was purged from public office in 1946 along with all other members of the wartime administration. In 1952, with the end of the occupation of Japan, he became one of the founding members of the Liberal Party headed by Shigeru Yoshida, forming his own faction within the party. However, he was defeated in the 1953 General Election, and went into retirement. Maeda died the following year.

  
 
 

1888 births
1954 deaths
People from Wakayama Prefecture
Government ministers of Japan
Rikken Seiyūkai politicians
Imperial Rule Assistance Association politicians
Liberal Party (Japan, 1945) politicians
Members of the House of Representatives (Empire of Japan)
Japan Progressive Party politicians